Johann Sebastian Bach (1685–1750) was a German composer of the Baroque period.

Bach may also refer to:

People
 Bach (surname)
 Bach family, a noted family in music
 Bach (actor), stage name of French actor, singer and music hall performer Charles-Joseph Pasquier (1882–1953)
 Sebastian Bach (born 1968), stage name of Canadian heavy metal singer Sebastian Bierk
 King Bach, American actor, comedian, and Internet personality
 Bill Bachrach (1879–1959), American swim coach known as "Bach"
 Joel Sirkis (1561–1640), Polish posek and halakhist, known as "the Bach"
 P. D. Q. Bach (1807–1742), a fictitious composer invented by musical satirist Peter Schickele
 Nigel Bach, the nom de plume of Tom Fanslau, the creator of the Bad Ben series

Places
 Bach, Austria, a municipality in Reutte
 Bach, Lot, a commune in France
 Bach an der Donau, a town in Regensburg, Bavaria, Germany
 Bäch, a settlement of the Freienbach municipality in Schwyz, Switzerland
 Bäch railway station, in Freienbach, Switzerland
 Bach, Michigan, US, an unincorporated community
 Bach Ice Shelf, on Alexander Island, Antarctica
 Bach quadrangle, on the planet Mercury
 Bach (crater), on the planet Mercury
 1814 Bach, an asteroid

Radio stations
 WBQK, a radio station licensed to West Point, Virginia, US, known as Bach FM
 WLTT, a defunct radio station formerly licensed to Carolina Beach, North Carolina, US, known as Bach FM from 2011 to 2013

Other uses
 Bach Gesellschaft, an 1850 society for publishing J.S. Bach's complete works
 Bach (journal), an academic journal of Baroque music
 BACH motif, a sequence of notes
 Bach (New Zealand), a modest holiday home or beach house
 Brown Association for Cooperative Housing, in Providence, Rhode Island, United States
 Bach Aircraft, an aircraft manufacturer from 1927 to 1931
 Bach-Werke-Verzeichnis (abbreviated BWV), a catalogue of compositions by J.S. Bach
 Quarry Bach, a slate quarry near Cilgerran, Wales

See also
 Bache (disambiguation)
 Bach House (disambiguation)
 Batch (disambiguation)
 Bạch, a Vietnamese surname
 Bachs, a municipality in the canton of Zürich, Switzerland